Pablo Echenique Robba (born 28 August 1978 in Rosario, Santa Fe, Argentina) is an Argentine-born Spanish physicist and politician.

He came to Spain aged 13 to live in Zaragoza. He had Spinal muscular atrophy. Echenique was elected a member of the Congress of Deputies in the April 2019 Spanish general election along with the left-wing political party Podemos. Previously, Echenique was one of the five MEPs elected by Podemos in the 2014 European Parliament election, and was a member of the Aragonese Corts between 2015 and 2017.

As a scientist, he holds a position at the Spanish National Research Council in Zaragoza (CSIC).

In October 2020, he was fined €11,040 for the irregular employment of his assistant. In November 2020, he was fined €80,000 for saying that a man who was murdered in 1985 was a rapist.

References

External links 

 De retrones y hombres 
 Pablo Echenique Robba at the European Parliament

1978 births
Living people
Members of the 13th Congress of Deputies (Spain)
MEPs for Spain 2014–2019
People from Rosario, Santa Fe
People with spinal muscular atrophy
Podemos (Spanish political party) MEPs
Politicians with disabilities
Spanish physicists
Spanish people with disabilities
Spanish people of Italian descent
Spanish people of Argentine descent
Members of the 14th Congress of Deputies (Spain)
University of Zaragoza alumni